The Nassau Avenue station is a station on the IND Crosstown Line of the New York City Subway. Located at the intersection of Manhattan and Nassau Avenues in Greenpoint, Brooklyn, it is served by the G train at all times.

History
This station opened on August 19, 1933 as the initial terminal station for the IND Crosstown Line. With the completion of the Crosstown Line on July 1, 1937, Nassau Avenue ceased to be the line's terminal.

Station layout

This underground station has two tracks and two side platforms. Both platforms have a green trim line with a black border and mosaic name tablets reading "NASSAU AVE." in white sans-serif lettering on a black background and green border. Small "NASSAU" tile captions in white lettering on a black background run directly below the trim line and directional signs in the same style are below some of the name tablets. Green I-beam columns run along both platforms at regular intervals with alternating ones having the standard black name plate in white lettering.

North of the station is a diamond crossover switch, allowing terminating trains to reverse direction. These switches were used in regular service until July 1, 1937, when the remainder of the Crosstown Line opened. Prior to that, Nassau Avenue was the line's southern terminus. South of the station, the line shifts from Manhattan Avenue onto Union Avenue, running diagonally under McCarren Park.

Exits
The station's full-time fare control is at the south end, which is the more heavily used of the station's two entry-exit points. A short staircase from each platform goes up to mezzanine level. On the Church Avenue-bound side, one exit-only turnstile and one High Entry/Exit Turnstile leads to two staircases going up to either western corners of Manhattan and Nassau Avenues. The Queens-bound side has the station's full-time turnstile bank, token booth, and two staircases going up to either eastern corners of the same intersection. A raised crossover connects the two sides both inside and outside fare control and is split in two by a steel fence. The mezzanine has mosaic directional signs in white lettering on a green background. G trains, which are about half the length of the  platform, stop near the south end of the station.

Both platforms have an unstaffed platform-level fare control at their north end, with no crossover. On the Church Avenue-bound side, one exit-only turnstile and one High Entry/Exit Turnstile lead to a single staircase going up to the northwest corner of Norman and Manhattan Avenues. On the Queens-bound side, a single full height turnstile leads to a staircase going up to the northeast corner of the same intersection.

In preparation for the 14th Street Tunnel shutdown in 2019, the split free/paid area at the south end of the station would have been reconfigured into an exclusively unpaid area. This would remove the free transfer between platforms, but would allow for increased flow from passengers entering and exiting the station.

References

External links 

 
 Station Reporter — G Train
 The Subway Nut — Nassau Avenue Pictures
 Nassau Avenue entrance from Google Maps Street View
 Norman Avenue entrance from Google Maps Street View
 Platforms from Google Maps Street View

IND Crosstown Line stations
New York City Subway stations in Brooklyn
Railway stations in the United States opened in 1933
1933 establishments in New York City
Greenpoint, Brooklyn